Maile Ngauamo (born 15 August 1993 in Tonga) is a Tongan rugby union player who plays for the Brumbies in Super Rugby. His playing position is hooker. He was announced as a replacement signing in May 2019.

Reference list

External links
Rugby.com.au profile
itsrugby.co.uk profile

1993 births
Tongan rugby union players
Living people
Rugby union hookers